Arhopala helianthes is a butterfly in the family Lycaenidae. It was described by Henley Grose-Smith in 1902. It is found in the Australasian realm, where it is endemic to New Guinea.

References

External links
Arhopala Boisduval, 1832 at Markku Savela's Lepidoptera and Some Other Life Forms. Retrieved June 3, 2017.

Arhopala
Butterflies described in 1902
Endemic fauna of New Guinea